Esther Hart may refer to:

 Esther Hart (singer) (born 1970), Dutch singer
 Esther Hart (Titanic survivor) (1863–1928), survivor of the sinking of the RMS Titanic

Hart, Esther